Björn Nilsson may refer to:

 Björn Nilsson (footballer) (born 1960), Swedish former footballer
 Björn Nilsson (dancer), dancer for the Danish Dance Theatre
 Björn Nilsson, musician with Slagsmålsklubben
 Björn Nilsson (rally driver) for 2007 World Rally Championship season